Turning assistant is a new advanced driver-assistance system introduced in 2015.

The system monitors opposing traffic when turning across traffic at low speeds. In critical situation, it brakes the car. This is a common scenario at busy city crossings as well as on highways, where the speed limits are higher.

Vehicles 

2016 Audi Q7: Turning Assistant
2015 Volvo XC90: City Safety (with auto brake in intersections)

Vehicle safety technologies
Warning systems
Advanced driver assistance systems